John Glandie, B.D. was an Irish Anglican priest in the second half of the 17th century.

A Prebendary of Christ Church Cathedral, Dublin  he was Dean of Cashel  from 1676 until his death on 22 January 1694.

References

Deans of Cashel
1796 deaths
17th-century Irish Anglican priests